Are You Ready may refer to:

Music

Albums 
 Are You Ready? (David Meece album), 1980
 Are You Ready (Bucks Fizz album), 1982
 Are You Ready (Blue Rodeo album), 2005
 Are You Ready (Shakaya album), 2006
 Are You Ready? (Abraham Mateo album), 2015
 Are You Ready?, a 1970 album by Pacific Gas & Electric
 Are You Ready!, a 1979 live album by the Atlanta Rhythm Section
 R U Ready?, a 2017 album by Lovelyz

Songs 
 "Are You Ready?" (Pacific Gas & Electric song), 1970
 "Are You Ready" (AC/DC song), 1990
 "Are You Ready" (Aaliyah song), 1996
 "Are You Ready?" (Creed song), 2000
 "Are You Ready" (Joanne song), 2001
 "Are You Ready" (Shakaya song), 2005
 "Are You Ready", a song from season 4 of Hannah Montana and Hannah Montana Forever (soundtrack)
 "Are You Ready?" (In Case of Fire song), 2010
 "Are You Ready?" (Fatty Gets a Stylist song), 2011
 Are You Ready (Disturbed song), 2018
 "Are U Ready?", a 2007 song by Pakito
 "Are You Ready", by Billy Ocean
 "Are You Ready", by Bob Dylan from Saved
 "Are You Ready?", by Boney James from Body Language
 "Are You Ready?", by D-Crunch from M0527
 "Are You Ready?!", by Devo from Mighty Morphin Power Rangers The Movie: Original Soundtrack Album
 "Are You Ready", by Grand Funk Railroad from On Time
 "Are You Ready?", by Hazen Street from Hazen Street
 "Are You Ready", by James from Strip-mine
 "Are You Ready?", by KC and the Sunshine Band from KC Ten
 "Are You Ready?", by Måneskin from Il ballo della vita
 "Are You Ready?", by Pebbles from Straight from My Heart
 "Are You Ready?", by RPA & The United Nations of Sound from United Nations of Sound
 "Are You Ready?", by The Sinceros from 2nd Debut
 "Are You Ready", by Thin Lizzy from Live and Dangerous
 "Are You Ready?", by Three Days Grace from Three Days Grace
 "Are You Ready", by Moxy from Ridin' High
 "Are you ready?", a single by Japanese idol group BiS
 "Are U Ready", a 2002 song by Groove Coverage
 "Are You Red..Y", by The Clash from Cut the Crap

Theatre 
 Are You Ready?, a play by David Auburn

See also
R. U. Reddy, a character in the Marvel Universe